When in Rome is a foreign language studio album by Cliff Richard released in 1965. It is Richard's eighth studio album and fifteenth album overall. The album of mainly Italian songs was recorded in Lisbon and features one track in Portuguese, "Maria Ninguém". The album was originally intended for Richard's Italian audience, but was also released domestically in the UK after Richard's earlier When in Spain album made the top ten of the UK Album Charts. This album however was not as well received and was Richard's first album to miss the charts.

Track listing

References

External links
 Cliff Richard's official website

1965 albums
Cliff Richard albums
Albums produced by Norrie Paramor
Columbia Records albums
Italian-language albums